The Augusta and Edgefield Railroad was a South Carolina railroad chartered by the state's General Assembly in 1884.

In late December 1886, the Augusta and Edgefield's charter was amended to change the carrier's name to the Augusta, Edgefield and Newberry Railroad.

References

Defunct South Carolina railroads
Predecessors of the Southern Railway (U.S.)
Railway companies established in 1884
Railway companies disestablished in 1885